The family Rhipiduridae are small insectivorous birds of Australasia, Southeast Asia and the Indian subcontinent that includes the fantails and silktails.

Taxonomy and systematics
There are four genera classified within the family:
 Subfamily Rhipidurinae:
Rhipidura – typical fantails (51 species)
Subfamily Lamproliinae:
Chaetorhynchus – drongo fantail
Eutrichomyias – cerulean flycatcher
Lamprolia – silktails (2 species)

References

 
Bird families